Besnik Begunca Stadium is the home stadium of KF Lepenci in Kaçanik, Kosovo. The stadium is named after Besnik Begunca, to honor him. Number 29 Bob.

References

Notes

Football venues in Kosovo
Kaçanik